Kulittalai block is a revenue block in the Karur district of Tamil Nadu, India. It has a total of 13 panchayat villages.

References 

 

Revenue blocks of Karur district